Qızılağac (also, Kizyl-Agach, Kizyl-Aghach, and Kyzylagach) is a village and municipality in the Salyan Rayon of Azerbaijan.  It has a population of 1,615.

References 

Populated places in Salyan District (Azerbaijan)